The Cabinet of Jordan is the chief executive body of the Hashemite Kingdom of Jordan.

The cabinet  was dissolved in April 2012.

References

External links 
 Prime Ministry website
 Government of Prime Minister Marouf Bakhit, Embassy of the Hashemite Kingdom of Jordan

Awn Shawkat Al-Khasawneh
Prime Ministry of Jordan
2011 establishments in Jordan
2012 disestablishments in Jordan
Cabinets established in 2011
Cabinets disestablished in 2012